Coleophora hinnula is a moth of the family Coleophoridae.

References

hinnula
Moths described in 1995